Melderslo is a village in the Dutch province of Limburg. It is located in the municipality of Horst aan de Maas.

The village was first mentioned in the 15th century Meldersloe, and either means "forest of Madalhêr (person)" or "forest belonging to Meerlo".

Melderslo was home to 301 people in 1840. On 26 May 1943, an Avro Lancaster was hit by Flak and crashed near Melderslo killing five of the crew member. A monument is located at the crash site. Museum De Locht is a museum for products produced in the region. In 1993, it was extended with the National Asparagus and Champignon.

Gallery

References 

Populated places in Limburg (Netherlands)
Horst aan de Maas